István Kiss (born 25 July 1958) is a Hungarian former water polo player who competed in the 1980 Summer Olympics.

See also
 List of Olympic medalists in water polo (men)
 List of World Aquatics Championships medalists in water polo

References

External links
 

1958 births
Living people
Hungarian male water polo players
Olympic water polo players of Hungary
Water polo players at the 1980 Summer Olympics
Olympic bronze medalists for Hungary
Olympic medalists in water polo
Medalists at the 1980 Summer Olympics
20th-century Hungarian people
21st-century Hungarian people